Somewhere Else is the fourteenth studio album by British neo-progressive rock band Marillion. It was released by the band's own label, Intact Records, in the United Kingdom on 9 April 2007. Produced by Michael Hunter, the album was recorded during 2006 at The Racket Club in Buckinghamshire, except the track "Faith", written during the Marbles sessions and recorded the previous year.

Artwork
The album title was initially supposed to be 14 and a cover art was prepared to match with it. However, the name altered and a new artwork became necessary. The final variant of the cover featuring a tower viewer also known as a coin-operated binoculars was designed by Carl Glover. It is quite similar to that of the Weather Report's compilation album Forecast: Tomorrow. The band had been aware of this but since it occurred by accident they decided not to change anything.

Release

Critical reception

Stephen Dalton of Uncut, describing Somewhere Else in a 3 star (out of 5) review, stated that "some tracks chime and soar like Coldplay. Others are just a post-rock whimper away from Radiohead". Dalton concluded that "Marillion deserve a fair hearing". Richard Mann of Guitarist was less impressed, claiming "with its bombastic production, meandering instrumentation and anthemic AOR choruses it's no doubt precisely the sort of thing owners of the other 13 albums by the band will lap up. But for the innocent bystander, there's really nothing to see here...Steve Rothery's guitars often seem weighed down with unnecessary effects from the Museum of Abandoned Guitar Sounds: the solos, usually a strong point, seem tossed off and inconsequential ... in places, the album's lyrics beggar belief." Mann concluded: "On Faith, the barely disguised aping of McCartney's Blackbird fingerpicking offers the final proof that there's little invention left in the tank."

Classic Rock ranked the album number 24 on their end-of-year list for 2007.

Commercial performance
Somewhere Else peaked at number 24 on the UK Albums Chart, becoming Marillion's first to enter the Top 40 since Radiation (1998). The first single from the album was "See It Like a Baby", a download-only release, which made number 45 on the UK Singles Chart. Follow-up "Thankyou Whoever You Are" fared better, reaching number 15 and giving the band their third Top 20 hit of the 2000s and in fact their second highest charting single since 1987's "Incommunicado".

2011 Madfish reissues
Unlike their previous two albums, Marillion did not ask fans to pre-order Somewhere Else before it was recorded because they did not need the money. This left some fans disappointed as there was no special edition available. However, a similar 36-page deluxe edition packaged in a digibook format with an additional artwork designed by Carl Glover was issued on 25 April 2011 by the independent label Madfish, a division of Snapper Music. Moreover, a limited double vinyl edition featuring a modified track listing and three extra live tracks, taken from the live video Somewhere in London, was released by Madfish on 11 July 2011.

Track listing

Two tracks from the sessions were included on different editions of the single "Thankyou Whoever You Are": "Circular Ride" and "Say the Word". These two b-sides have not been included on any edition of the album so far.

2011 Madfish 2xLP edition

Side one
"The Other Half"
"See It Like a Baby"
"Somewhere Else"

Side two
"Thankyou Whoever You"
"Most Toys"
"Last Century for Man"
"Faith"

Side three
"A Voice from the Past"
"No Such Thing"
"The Wound"

Side four
"The Other Half (Live)"
"Somewhere Else (Live)"
"Voice from the Past (Live)"

Personnel

Marillion
Steve Hogarth – vocals, piano, and percussion
Mark Kelly – keyboards
Ian Mosley – drums
Steve Rothery – guitars
Pete Trewavas – bass, electric guitar, and acoustic guitar (on "Faith")

Additional musicians
Sam Morris – French horn (on "Faith")

Technical
Michael Hunter – production, recording, and mixing
Peter Mew – mastering (at Abbey Road Studios)
Carl Glover – design and photography

Charts

Album

Singles

Release history

References

Notes

Citations

External links
The Official Marillion Website

Marillion albums
2007 albums
Neo-progressive rock albums